Agali is a mandal in Sri Sathya Sai district of Andhra Pradesh, India. It is about 151 kilometers from Anantapur town and bordered by Karnataka state and Rolla Mandal of Sri Sathya Sai district.

Towns and villages 
Agali is the most populated village and Hulikeradevarahalli is the least populated settlement in the mandal. As of the 2011 Census of India, the mandal has 8 settlements, that includes the following: Agali, Hulikeradevarahalli, Inagalore, Kodihalli, Madhudi, Narasambudi, P.Byadigera, Ravudi and Ragelinganahalli.

Sources
 Census India 2011 (sub districts)
 Revenue Department of AP

References 

Mandals in Sri Sathya Sai district